

Season 1 (1975–76)

Season 2 (1976–77)

Season 3 (1977–78)

Season 4 (1978–79)

Season 5 (1979–80)

Season 6 (1980–81)

Season 7 (1981–82)

Season 8 (1982–83)

Season 9 (1983–84)

Season 10 (1984–85)

Season 11 (1985–86)

Season 12 (1986–87)

Season 13 (1987–88)

Season 14 (1988–89)

Season 15 (1989–90)

Season 16 (1990–91)

Season 17 (1991–92)

Season 18 (1992–93)

Season 19 (1993–94)

Season 20 (1994–95)

Season 21 (1995–96)

Season 22 (1996–97)

Season 23 (1997–98)

Season 24 (1998–99)

Season 25 (1999–2000)

Season 26 (2000–01)

Season 27 (2001–02)

Season 28 (2002–03)

Season 29 (2003–04)

Season 30 (2004–05)

References

Saturday Night Live
Saturday Night Live
Episodes
Saturday Night Live in the 1970s
Saturday Night Live in the 1980s
Saturday Night Live in the 1990s
Saturday Night Live in the 2000s